Klubi i Futbollit Tirana Femra (commonly referred to as KF Tirana Women, Tirana Women, or simply Tirana) is an Albanian women's football club based in Tiranë. The women's team is part of the multi-disciplinary sports club, SK Tirana. They play their home games at the Skënder Halili Complex in Tirana and compete in the Kategoria Femra.

Players

Squad

Managers
  Edmond Ruci (1 January 2020 — 30 June 2021 )
 Alpin Gallo (1 July 2021 — )

Recent seasons

References

External links
KF Tirana official website 

Women
Football clubs in Albania
Women's football clubs in Albania